The human ADI1 gene encodes the enzyme 1,2-dihydroxy-3-keto-5-methylthiopentene dioxygenase.

Function 

The enzyme belongs to the aci-reductone dioxygenase family of metal-binding enzymes, which are involved in methionine salvage. This enzyme may regulate mRNA processing in the nucleus, and may carry out different functions depending on its localization.

Clinical significance 

Diseases associated with ADI1 include Klebsiella, and refsum disease.

ADI1 is capable for supporting hepatitis C virus replication in an otherwise non-permissive cell line. Mouse hepatoma cells coexpressing human CD81 and ADI1/Sip-L supported HCV infection and replication. Human ADI1//Sip-L over-expression in 293 cells enhances cell entry but not replication of HCV.

References

External links

Further reading